Made in Mexico may refer to:

 Made in Mexico (band), a band with Skin Graft Records
 Made in Mexico (TV series), a 2018 reality television series
 Made in Mexico, a 1998 version of the Fender Wide Range guitar pickup
 "Made in Mexico", a 2022 song by Eric Ethridge
 Manufacturing in Mexico

See also
 Hecho en Mexico (disambiguation)